The 1998 NCAA Women's Gymnastics championship involved 12 schools competing for the national championship of women's NCAA Division I gymnastics.  It was the seventeenth NCAA gymnastics national championship and the defending NCAA Team Champion for 1997 was UCLA.  The competition took place in Los Angeles, California, hosted by UCLA in the Pauley Pavilion. The 1998 Championship was won by Georgia.

Champions

Team Results

Session 1

Session 2

Super Six

External links
  Gym Results

NCAA Women's Gymnastics championship
1998 in women's gymnastics